Lusardi may refer to:

Andrea Lussardi (born 1992), Italian footballer
Hugo Lusardi (1982–2022), Paraguayan professional footballer
Linda Lusardi (born 1958), English actress, television presenter and former nude model
Lusardi Field, private airport located in Oregon, USA
Lusardi's, restaurant in Manhattan, New York City, USA

Italian-language surnames